Lempo is a sort of fiend from Finnish folklore and mythology. Lempo is the god of love and fertility in Finnish mythology.

After Christianity came to Finland, the reputation of Lempo worsened: it is portrayed in the folklore usually as an erratic spirit, as love can be capricious, even dangerous, and it could even take control of a being and turn them to destruction.

Lempo brought down the hero Väinämöinen with the help of his two demon cohorts, Hiisi and Paha.

The words "lempo" and "hiisi" are also used as very mild swear words in the Finnish language. Piru is a slightly stronger swear word.

See also 
 47171 Lempo, minor planet

References

External links and references
 The Kalevala Glossary
 Taivaannaula: Lempo 

Finnish gods
Finnish legendary creatures
Love and lust gods